The short-tailed spiny-rat (Proechimys brevicauda) or Huallaga spiny rat, is a spiny rat species found in Bolivia, Brazil, Colombia, Ecuador and Peru.

Phylogeny
Morphological characters and mitochondrial cytochrome b DNA sequences showed that P. brevicauda belongs to the so-called longicaudatus group of Proechimys species, and shares closer phylogenetic affinities with the other members of this clade: P. longicaudatus and P. cuvieri.

References

External links
 Infonatura 

Proechimys
Mammals of Colombia
Mammals described in 1877
Taxa named by Albert Günther